Shekalim is the fourth tractate in the order of Moed in the Mishnah. Its main subject is half-shekel tax that ancient Jews paid every year to make possible the maintenance and proper functioning of the Temple in Jerusalem. There is no Gemara about the treatise in the Babylonian Talmud, but there is one in the Jerusalem Talmud, and the latter is often printed in the editions of the Babylonian Talmud.

Chapters
There are eight chapters in this tractate, as follows:
 בְּאֶחָד בַּאֲדָר (Be'echad Ba'adar) --- This chapter is concerned with dates of the payment of the tax and who would pay it.  The tax was collected throughout the month of Adar.  Women, slaves, and minors were not required to pay the tax but could do so if they wished; pagans and Samaritans were not allowed to pay at all.  
 מְצָרְפִין שְׁקָלִים (Metzrfin Shekalim)
 בִּשְׁלשָׁה פְּרָקִים (Bishlosha Perakim)
 הַתְּרוּמָה (Haterumah)
 אֵלּוּ הֵן הַמְמֻנִּין (Elu Hen Hamemunin)
 שְלשָׁה עָשָר שוֹפָרוֹת (Shloshah Asar Shofarot)
 מָעוֹת שֶׁנִּמְצְאוּ (Ma'ot Shenimtze'u)
 כָּל הָרֻקִּין (Kol Harukin)

References

External links
Mishnah Shekalim text in Hebrew and English
Mishnah Shekalim text in Hebrew

Mishnah